Fundus (Latin for "bottom") is an anatomical term referring to that part of a concavity in any organ, which is at the far end from its opening. It may refer to:

Anatomy
 Fundus (brain), the deepest part of any sulcus of the cerebral cortex
 Fundus (eye), the interior surface of the eye, opposite the lens, and including the retina, optic disc, macula and fovea, and posterior pole
 Fundus camera, equipment for photographing the interior of the eye
 Fundus photography
 Fundus (stomach), the portion of the stomach which bulges up past the point of entry of the esophagus
 Fundus (uterus), the top portion, opposite from the cervix
 Fundus of gallbladder, the portion of the gallbladder which lies the farthest from the cystic duct
 Fundus of the urinary bladder

Other uses
 Fundus (seabed), the seabed in a tidal river below low water mark